Huda's Salon is a 2021 Palestinian internationally co-produced thriller film written, directed, and produced by Hany Abu-Assad. It stars  Ali Suliman, Samer Bisharat, Maisa Abd Elhadi and Manal Awad.

It had its world premiere at the 2021 Toronto International Film Festival in September 2021.

Cast
 Ali Suliman as Hasan
 Samer Bisharat as Said
 Maisa Abd Elhadi as Reem
 Manal Awad as Huda

Production
In February 2020, it was announced Ali Suliman and Maisa Abd Elhadi had joined the cast of the film, with Hany Abu-Assad directing from a screenplay he wrote.

Principal photography was suspended on 20 March 2020, due to the COVID-19 pandemic, and resumed on 15 July 2020. Production on the film was suspended again, with production concluding by December 2020.

Release
Huda's Salon had its world premiere at the 2021 Toronto International Film Festival in September 2021. Prior to, IFC Films acquired U.S. distribution rights to the film.

References

External links
 
Huda's Salon at IFC Films

2021 films
Palestinian drama films
IFC Films films
Films directed by Hany Abu-Assad
2021 thriller films